Henry Z (Hank) Jones Jr. (born June 3, 1940) is an American actor, musician, genealogist and author. He became known to a wide audience primarily through his appearances in Disney films.

Life 

Hank was born in Oakland, California and raised in San Leandro, California. He attended San Leandro High School and Stanford University majoring in communications. While in school he was singer in the band Hank Jones & The White Bucks, as a student he formed the duo Hank and Dean with his schoolfriend Dean Kay. They had their first record contract with RCA Victor in 1961. Later albums were recorded with Capitol and Epitomé Records. Hank and Dean got into television entertainment in 1962 and performed in ABC's Tennessee Ernie Ford Show. Dean was drafted in 1963 and the duo dissolved. Dean became a music publishing executive, Hank's emphasis shifted towards TV entertainment and show-biz. He starred in eight Disney films in the 1960s and 1970s.

On television, Hank had roles in My Three Sons (1960) with Fred MacMurray and William Frawley and in the Patty Duke Show (1963). He was featured in many comedy programs of the 1960s and 1970s, including Petticoat Junction (1963), Love, American Style (1969), The Jeffersons (1975), Love Boat (1977), Mork & Mindy (1978) and many others. One of his most interesting roles was playing the twin brother of the Beatle Ringo Starr (after five hours of makeup every day) in a TV version of Mark Twain's Prince & The Pauper. Over the years, Hank was featured in countless television commercials, some of which have won awards (for MacDonalds, Hai Karate After Shave, Honda, and Dial Soap) and were shown on NBC's World's Greatest Commercials. A longtime songwriter and member of ASCAP, Hank's song Midnight Swinger recorded by Mel Tormé in 1970 obtained a preliminary Grammy nomination. In 1986 Hank featured three times as the champion on the popular TV quiz show Jeopardy!

In 1981 he withdrew from the entertainment industry and increasingly turned to genealogy, his hobby from childhood. One of his ancestors was Abraham Bergmann, who emigrated in 1709 with a group of German Palatines from Iggelheim from the Electoral Palatinate to County Limerick in Ireland. Hank studied the records of the entire group of emigrants intensively and over the years published several books on this subject, first The Palatine Families of Ireland (1965, 2nd expanded edition 1990), then his main work The Palatine Families of New York (2 volumes, 1985). The work documents the origins and whereabouts of the 847 Palatinate families settled in New York State and won the 1986 Donald Lines Jacobus Award for the best genealogical work and the Award of Merit from the National Genealogical Society. Hank was elected as one of the 50 fellows to the American Society of Genealogists, of which he later became president. He was also a fellow of the New York Genealogical and Biographical Society.

Hank was married twice. From his first marriage he has a daughter Amanda. He lives in San Diego with his second wife, Bonnie.

Filmography (selection) 
1965: Girl Happy as Boy (uncredited)
1965: Village of the Giants as Chuck
1967: The Young Warriors as Fairchild
1968: Blackbeard's Ghost as Gudger Larkin
1970: Tora! Tora! Tora! as Davey - Student Pilot in Biplane
1970: The Love Doctors as Rex
1971: The Barefoot Executive as Stan (uncredited)
1971: The Million Dollar Duck as Commencement Speaker (uncredited)
1974: Herbie Rides Again as Sir Lancelot
1976: No Deposit, No Return as Banana Cop
1976: The Shaggy D.A. as Policeman
1978: The Cat from Outer Space as Officer

Works 
 The Palatine Families of New York - 1710: A Supplement
 A few more left! 
  Arrival Time 
  German origins of Jost Hite, Virginia pioneer, 1685–1761 
  Memories: the "show-biz" part of my life 
  Psychic roots: serendipity & intuition in genealogy 
  Story of Isaac Hillman 
  The Palatine Families of Ireland 
  The Palatine Families of New York 
  More Palatine families: some immigrants to the middle colonies 1717–1776 and their European origins, plus new discoveries on German families who arrived in Colonial New York in 1710 
  The Palatine Families of New York 1710: A supplement 
  Westerwald to America: some 18th century German immigrants

References

External links 
 
 
 Henry Z (“Hank”) Jones Jr., Biographical Material at www.hankjones.com
 Henry Z (“Hank”) Jones Jr., Publications at fasg.org

1940 births
Living people
American male singer-songwriters
20th-century American male actors
20th-century American historians
20th-century American male writers
21st-century American historians
21st-century American male writers
Male actors from California
Disney people
American writers
American genealogists
Fellows of the American Society of Genealogists
American singer-songwriters
American male non-fiction writers